Kieran Molloy may refer to:
 Kieran Molloy (boxer)
 Kieran Molloy (Gaelic footballer)